Picture Rocks is the name of some places in the United States:

 Picture Rocks, Arizona
 Picture Rocks, Pennsylvania